William Royall may refer to:

William Royall (settler), (–1676), English settler of North Yarmouth, Maine
William B. Royall (1825–1895), Union Army officer during the American Civil War